Macon County is a county located in the U.S. state of North Carolina. As of the 2020 census, the population was 37,014. Its county seat is Franklin.

The Nantahala River runs through Macon County, flowing into the Little Tennessee River in Swain County. The Nantahala is one of the most popular whitewater rafting destinations in the nation.

History
The river valleys were long occupied by indigenous peoples, some of whom built earthwork mounds about 1000 CE. Some are still visible in this region. It was part of the homeland of the historic Cherokee people,  who had towns throughout the river valleys. The Cherokee in Western North Carolina are known as the Eastern Band of Cherokee Indians, a federally recognized tribe.

The county was formed in 1828 from the western part of Haywood County.  It was named for Nathaniel Macon, who represented North Carolina in the United States House of Representatives from 1791 to 1815 (serving as Speaker of the House from 1801 to 1807), and in the United States Senate from 1815 to 1828.

In 1839 the western part of Macon County became Cherokee County.  In 1851 parts of Macon County and Haywood County were combined to form Jackson County.

Geography

Of the land in Macon County,  (46.1%) are federal lands that lie within the Nantahala National Forest and are administered by the United States Forest Service. The county's largest natural water supply is the Cullasaja River. The Nantahala River also runs through the county, and flows into the Little Tennessee River.

Waterfalls

Cullasaja Falls

Cullasaja Falls is a waterfall in Southwestern North Carolina east of Franklin. The waterfall is located on the Cullasaja River in the Nantahala National Forest and is part of the Mountain Waters Scenic Byway. Cullasaja comes from a Cherokee word meaning "honey locust place." The falls is the last major waterfall on the Cullasaja River. The height of the falls is given as 200 ft (61 m) in Kevin Adams' book, North Carolina Waterfalls and 250 ft (77 m) by NCWaterfalls.com. Google Earth gives a height (based on the elevation of the water at the top of the falls and the elevation of the plunge pool at the bottom of the falls) of 137 ft (42 m).

The falls can be glimpsed from vehicles on the road; however, getting a better view of the falls is not easy. The falls are located beside of a series of blind curves on Highway 64 with sheer rock cliffs above and below the road. There is only one small pull-off near the falls, but walking on the road puts visitors in danger of being hit by a passing vehicle. This water fall is just up the road of the Cullasaja River RV Park.

Dry Falls

Dry Falls, also known as Upper Cullasaja Falls, is a 65-foot (20.1 m) waterfall located in the Nantahala National Forest, northwest of Highlands, North Carolina.  Dry Falls flows on the Cullasaja River through the Nantahala National Forest.  It is part of a series of waterfalls on an  stretch of the river that eventually ends with Cullasaja Falls.  Dry Falls flows over an overhanging bluff that allows visitors to walk up under the falls and remain relatively dry when the water flow is low, hence its name.  Visitors will get wet if the water flow is high.  The falls has been called Dry Falls for a long time, but has also been known by such names as High Falls, Pitcher Falls, and Cullasaja Falls.

There is a parking area on the side of the road, where visitors can park before walking the short path with stairs to the falls. Significant improvements to the parking area and trail were completed by the United States Forest Service in 2009.

Bridal Veil Falls

Bridal Veil Falls is a 45-foot (20.1 m) waterfall located in the Nantahala National Forest, southeast of Franklin. With a short curve of roadway located behind the falls, it has the distinction of being the only waterfall in the state that one can drive a vehicle under.  Bridal Veil Falls flows on a tributary of the Cullasaja River through the Nantahala National Forest.  The falls flows over an overhanging bluff; visitors may walk behind the falls and remain dry when the water flow is low. During periods of drought, the stream may nearly dry up, though visitors will get wet if the water flow is moderate or high. To avoid this, visitors may drive behind the falls.

Highway 64 originally used the curve of roadway behind the falls exclusively so that all traffic went behind them; however, this caused problems with icing of the roadway during freezing weather. Hwy. 64 has since been re-routed around the front of the falls. There is a parking area on the side of the road, where visitors can park and view the falls as well. In 2003, a massive boulder slid off the left side of the falls, blocking that side of the drive-under completely. However, in July 2007, that boulder was removed by a local developer. The road under the falls is now free of obstruction.

Quarry Falls

Quarry Falls is a small waterfall (or perhaps large rapid in high water) located beside US Hwy. 64 southeast of Franklin. Known to locals as "Bust Your Butt," it is best known for the large, deep pool at the bottom, and is a popular place for swimming during warm weather.

National protected areas 
 Ellicott Rock Wilderness (part)
 Nantahala National Forest (part)

State and local protected areas/sites 
 Euchella Site
 Franklin Town Square
 Nantahala Game Lands
 Tessentee Bottomland Preserve

Major water bodies 
 Beech Creek
 Blazed Creek
 Buck Creek
 Cartoogechaye Creek
 Chattooga River
 Cullasaja River
 Little Laurel Creek
 Little Tennessee River
 Middle Creek
 Nantahala Lake
 Nantahala River
 Queens Creek
 Tallulah River
 Tessentee Creek

Adjacent counties
 Swain County – north
 Jackson County – east
 Oconee County, South Carolina – southeast
 Rabun County, Georgia – south
 Clay County – southwest
 Cherokee County – west
 Graham County – northwest

Major highways

Major infrastructure 
 Macon County Airport

Demographics

2020 census

As of the 2020 United States census, there were 37,014 people, 15,921 households, and 10,250 families residing in the county.

2000 census
As of the census of 2000, there were 29,811 people, 12,828 households, and 8,902 families residing in the county.  The population density was 58 people per square mile (22/km2).  There were 20,746 housing units at an average density of 40 per square mile (16/km2).  The racial makeup of the county was 97.18% White, 1.20% Black or African American, 0.28% Native American, 0.39% Asian, 0.02% Pacific Islander, 0.31% from other races, and 0.63% from two or more races.  1.52% of the population were Hispanic or Latino of any race.

There were 12,828 households, out of which 24.80% had children under the age of 18 living with them, 58.50% were married couples living together, 8.00% had a female householder with no husband present, and 30.60% were non-families. 27.00% of all households were made up of individuals, and 13.60% had someone living alone who was 65 years of age or older.  The average household size was 2.28 and the average family size was 2.74.

In the county, the population was spread out, with 20.30% under the age of 18, 6.10% from 18 to 24, 23.20% from 25 to 44, 27.90% from 45 to 64, and 22.40% who were 65 years of age or older.  The median age was 45 years. For every 100 females there were 92.10 males.  For every 100 females age 18 and over, there were 88.40 males.

The median income for a household in the county was $32,139, and the median income for a family was $37,381. Males had a median income of $28,113 versus $20,081 for females. The per capita income for the county was $18,642.  About 8.80% of families and 12.60% of the population were below the poverty line, including 16.00% of those under age 18 and 11.80% of those age 65 or over.

Law, government, public safety

Government
Macon County is governed by its elected Board of Commissioners and administered by the Board's appointed County Manager. Macon County is a member of the regional Southwestern Commission council of governments.

Public safety

Sheriff and municipal police
The Macon County Sheriff's Office provides court security, jail administration, and protection of all county owned facilities for all of Macon county plus patrol and detective services for the unincorporated parts of the county. Incorporated towns Franklin, pop 3,845, and Highlands. population 924, have municipal police departments. When requested, assistance is available from the North Carolina State Bureau of Investigation, SBI.

Fire and Emergency services
Macon County Emergncy Services oversees contracts with the eleven volunteer fire departments that provide protection to Macon County residents and businesses and also provides for fire inspections. Macon County has a fire prevention ordinance enforceable by civil and criminal penalties,

Education

Franklin High School
Franklin High School is a public high school serving grades 9–12, and is a part of the Macon County Schools district.

Union Academy
Union Academy is an alternative public school in Macon County, North Carolina for grades 6–12. It is located near the South Macon Elementary school. Its name was changed from Union Alternative in 2006.

Macon Early College
Macon Early College is a high school that offers college classes located next to the
greenway and public library of Franklin. Southwestern Community College (North Carolina) is a partner in the program. As of 2008, SCC was ranked 4th in the list of Americas best community
colleges. Macon Early College is one of the three high schools in the Macon area, coming into existence after the Franklin High School, but before the Union Academy.

Communities

Towns
 Franklin (county seat and largest town)
 Highlands

Unincorporated communities

 Aquone
 Cullasaja
 Etna
 Gneiss
 Holly Springs
 Iotla
 Kyle
 Leatherman
 Oak Grove
 Otto
 Peek's Creek
 Prentiss
 Rainbow Springs
 Scaly Mountain
 West's Mill

Townships

 Burningtown
 Cartoogechaye
 Cowee
 Ellijay
 Flats
 Franklin
 Highlands
 Millshoal
 Nantahala
 Smithbridge (formerly Smith's Bridge)
 Sugarfork

See also
 List of counties in North Carolina
 National Register of Historic Places listings in Macon County, North Carolina
 List of national forests of the United States

References

External links

 
 

 
1828 establishments in North Carolina
Populated places established in 1828
Counties of Appalachia